Zun-Khuray is a rural locality (a settlement) in Khorinsky District, Republic of Buryatia, Russia. The population was 383 as of 2010. There are 6 streets.

Geography 
Zun-Khuray is located 63 km east of Khorinsk (the district's administrative centre) by road. Oninoborsk is the nearest rural locality.

References 

Rural localities in Khorinsky District